Kooi, Kooij or Kooy is a Dutch surname. Translated as "cage", the name often referred to a pen or duck decoy, and  originated with a herder, duck breeder/hunter, or cage maker. The forms Van der Kooi etc. mean "from the pen / duck decoy". In the Netherlands, the archaic spelling Kooij is most common, while it is usually rendered Kooy abroad.  Notable people with the surname include:

Kooi(j)/Kooy
Chris Kooy (born 1982), Canadian soccer midfielder
Debbie Kooij (born 1968), Dutch cricketer 
Dick Kooy (born 1987), Dutch volleyball player
Earl R. Kooi (1917–2003), American chemist, first to produce high fructose corn syrup
Ellen Kooi (born 1962), Dutch artist and photographer
Manfred Kooy (born 1970), Dutch Paralympic middle-distance runner
Peter Kooij/Kooy (born 1954), Dutch bass singer 
Van der Kooi(j)/Kooy
Ben van der Kooi (born 1983/84), Dutch ultranationalist
Derek van der Kooy (born 1952), Canadian neurobiologist
Hessel van der Kooij (born 1955), Dutch pop singer
Jan van der Kooi (born 1957), Dutch painter and draftsman
Jorrit van der Kooi (born 1972), Dutch-born film and TV director and presenter
 (born 1951), Dutch organist
Jurjen van der Kooi (1943-2018), Dutch folklorist
Karen van der Kooij (born 1963), Dutch sprinter
Mike van der Kooy (born 1989), Dutch football defender
 (1768–1836), Dutch portrait painter

See also
De Kooy (hamlet) and De Kooy Airfield, near Den Helder, Netherlands 
KOOI, a Texas radio station
Kooiman and Kooijman, Dutch surnames with the same origin
Alan Kooi Simpson (born 1931), US senator, son of Lorna Kooi

References

Dutch-language surnames
Occupational surnames